Gemini 10 (officially Gemini X) was a 1966 crewed spaceflight in NASA's Gemini program. It was the 8th crewed Gemini flight, the 16th crewed American flight, and the 24th spaceflight of all time (includes X-15 flights over ).  During the mission, flown by future STS-1 Commander John Young and future Apollo 11 Command Module Pilot Michael Collins, Collins became the first person to perform two extravehicular activities.

Crew

Backup crew

Support crew
Edwin E. "Buzz" Aldrin (Houston CAPCOM)
L. Gordon Cooper Jr. (Cape and Houston CAPCOM)

Jim Lovell and Buzz Aldrin had originally been named the backup crew, but after Charles Bassett and Elliot See died in a T-38 crash, they were moved to the backup crew for Gemini 9 and Alan Bean and Clifton Williams were moved to the Gemini 10 flight.

Mission parameters
Mass: 
Perigee: 
Apogee: 
Inclination: 28.87°
Period: 88.79 min

Docking
Docked: July 19, 1966 - 04:15:00 UTC
Undocked: July 20, 1966 - 19:00:00 UTC

Space walk
 Collins - EVA 1 (stand up)
Start: July 19, 1966, 21:44:00 UTC
End: July 19, 1966, 22:33:00 UTC
Duration: 0 hours, 49 minutes
 Collins - EVA 2
Start: July 20, 1966, 23:01:00 UTC
End: July 20, 1966, 23:40:00 UTC
Duration: 0 hours, 39 minutes

Objectives

Gemini 10 was designed to achieve rendezvous and docking with an Agena Target Vehicle (ATV), and EVA. It was also planned to dock with the ATV from the Gemini 8 mission. This Agena's battery power had failed months earlier, and an approach and docking would demonstrate the ability to rendezvous with a passive object. It would be also the first mission to fire the Agena's own rocket, allowing them to reach higher orbits.

Gemini 10 established that radiation at high altitude was not a problem. After leaving the first Agena, they then rendezvoused with the derelict Agena left over from the aborted Gemini 8 flight—thus executing the program's first double rendezvous. With no electricity on board the second Agena, the rendezvous was accomplished with eyes only—no radar.

After the rendezvous, Collins spacewalked over to the dormant Agena at the end of a  tether, making him the first person to meet another spacecraft in orbit. Collins then retrieved a cosmic dust-collecting panel from the side of the Agena. As he was concentrating on keeping his tether clear of the Gemini and Agena, Collins' Hasselblad camera worked itself free and drifted away, so he was unable to take photographs during the spacewalk.

Flight
The Agena launched perfectly for the second time, after problems had occurred with the targets for Gemini 6 and 9. Gemini 10 followed 100 minutes later and entered a  orbit. They were  behind the Agena. Two anomalous events occurred during the launch. At liftoff, a propellant fill umbilical became snared with its release lanyard. It ripped out of the LC-19 service tower and remained attached to the second stage during ascent. Tracking camera footage also showed that the first stage oxidizer tank dome ruptured after staging and released a cloud of nitrogen tetroxide. The telemetry package on the first stage had been disabled at staging, so visual evidence was the only data available. Film review of the Titan II ICBM launches found at least seven other instances of post-staging tank ruptures, most likely caused by flying debris, second stage engine exhaust, or structural bending. NASA finally decided that this phenomenon did not pose any safety risk to the astronauts and took no corrective action.

First rendezvous
Collins was unable to use the sextant for navigation as it did not seem to work as expected. At first he mistook airglow as the real horizon when trying to make some fixes on stars. When the image didn't seem right he tried another instrument, but this was not practical to use as it had a very small field of view.

They had a backup in the form of the computers on the ground. They made their first burn to put them into a  orbit. However Young didn't realize that during the next burn, he had the spacecraft turned slightly, which meant that they introduced an out-of-plane error. This meant two extra burns were necessary, and by the time they had docked with the Agena, 60% of their fuel had been consumed. It was decided to keep the Gemini docked to the Agena as long as possible, as this would mean that they could use the fuel on board the Agena for attitude control.

The first burn of the Agena engine lasted 80 seconds and put them in a  orbit. This burn was quite a ride for the crew. Because the Gemini and Agena docked nose-to-nose, the forces experienced were "eyeballs out" as opposed to "eyeballs in" for a launch from Earth. The crew took a couple of pictures when they reached apogee but were more interested in what was going on in the spacecraft — checking the systems and watching the radiation dosage meter.

After this they had their sleep period which lasted for eight hours and then they were ready for another busy day. The crew's first order of business was to make a second burn with the Agena engine to put them into the same orbit as the Gemini 8 Agena.

EVA 1
The first of two EVAs on Gemini 10 was a standup EVA, where Collins would stand in the open hatch and take photographs of stars as part of experiment S-13. They used a 70 mm general purpose camera to image the southern Milky Way in ultraviolet. After orbital sunrise Collins photographed a color plate on the side of the spacecraft (MSC-8) to see whether film reproduced colors accurately in space. He reentered the spacecraft six minutes early when both astronauts found that their eyes were irritated, which was caused by a minor leak of lithium hydroxide in the astronauts' oxygen supply.  After repressurizing the cabin, they ran the oxygen at high rates and flushed the environment system.

After the exercise of the EVA Young and Collins slept in their second 'night' in space. The next 'morning' they started preparing for the second rendezvous and another EVA.

Second rendezvous
After undocking from their Agena, the crew thought they sighted the Gemini 8 Agena. They found the Agena to be very stable and in good condition.

EVA 2
At 48 hours and 41 minutes into the mission, the second EVA began. Collins' first task was to retrieve a Micrometeorite Collector (S-12) from the side of the spacecraft. This he accomplished with some difficulty (similar to that encountered by Eugene Cernan on Gemini 9A). The collector floated out of the cabin at some time during the EVA, and was lost.

Collins next traveled over to the Agena and tried to grab onto the docking cone but found this impossible as it was smooth and had no grip. He used a nitrogen-propelled Hand-Held Maneuvering Unit (HHMU) to move himself towards the Gemini and then back to the Agena. This time he was able to grab hold of some wire bundles and retrieved the Micrometeorite Collector (S-10) from the Agena. He decided against replacing it as a piece of shroud had come loose on the Agena which could have snared the umbilical, and returning to the Gemini was deemed the safest course of action.

The last tasks remaining on this EVA were to test out the HHMU, test orbital mechanics using a tether between the Gemini and Agena, and for Young in the spacecraft to translate over to a passive Collins. However, due to low propellant quantity remaining, combined with intermittent telemetry to monitor it, these fuel costly manoeuvres were abandoned and the EVA was finished after only 39 minutes. During this time, it took the crew eight minutes to close the hatch as they had some difficulty with the  umbilical. It was jettisoned along with the chestpack used by Collins an hour later when they opened the hatch for the third and final time.

Experiments
There were ten other experiments that the crew performed during the mission. Three were interested in radiation: MSC-3 was the Tri-Axis Magnetometer which measured levels in the South Atlantic Anomaly. There was also MSC-6, a beta spectrometer, which measured potential radiation doses for Apollo missions, and MSC-7, a bremsstrahlung spectrometer which detected radiation flux as a function of energy when the spacecraft passed through the South Atlantic Anomaly.

S-26 investigated the ion and electron wake of the spacecraft. This provided limited results due to the lack of fuel for attitude control, but found that electron and ion temperatures were higher than expected and it registered shock effects during docking and undocking.

The S-5 and S-6 experiments were performed, which were previously carried on Gemini 9A; these were Synoptic Terrain and Synoptic Weather photography respectively. There was also S-1 which was intended to image the Zodiacal light. All of these experiments were of little use as the film used was only half as sensitive as Gemini 9A and the dirty windows lowered the transmission of light by a factor of six.

The crew also tried to perform D-5, a navigation experiment. They were only able to track five stars, with six needed for accurate measurements. The last experiment, D-10, was to investigate an ion-sensing attitude control system. This experiment measured the attitude of the spacecraft from the flow of ions and electrons around the spacecraft in orbit. The results from this experiment showed the system to be accurate and responsive.

Re-entry

The last day of the mission was short and retrofire came at 70 hours and 10 minutes into the mission.

The Gemini 10 mission was supported by the following U.S. Department of Defense resources: 9,067 personnel, 78 aircraft and 13 ships.

Insignia

The patch is simple in design but highly symbolic. The main feature is a large X with a Gemini and Agena orbiting around it. The two stars have a variety of meanings: the two rendezvous attempts, Castor and Pollux in Gemini or the two crew members. This is one of the few crew patches without the crew's name. It is able to be displayed "upside down" but is correctly shown with the spacecraft to the right. It was designed by Young's first wife, Barbara.

Spacecraft location

For many years the spacecraft was the centerpiece of a space exhibition at Norsk Teknisk Museum, Oslo, Norway. It was returned on request in 2002.

The spacecraft is currently on display at the Cosmosphere in Hutchinson, Kansas.

See also

 Agena Target Vehicle
 Extra-vehicular activity
 List of spacewalks
 Splashdown
 Space exploration
 U.S. space exploration history on U.S. stamps
 Space suit
 Space capsule

References

External links

NASA Gemini 10 press kit - July 15, 1966
 Gemini 10 Mission Report (PDF) August 1966

 U.S. Space Objects Registry https://web.archive.org/web/20090521121750/http://usspaceobjectsregistry.state.gov/search/index.cfm

Extravehicular activity
Human spaceflights
Project Gemini missions
Spacecraft launched in 1966
Spacecraft launched by Titan rockets
Spacecraft which reentered in 1966
July 1966 events
John Young (astronaut)
Michael Collins (astronaut)